Guaranty Bank was a bank based in Milwaukee, Wisconsin. It had 119 branches, 107 of which were kiosks in grocery stores and Walmart Supercenters. The bank operated in five states: Wisconsin, Illinois, Michigan, Minnesota, and Georgia. The bank also operated locations under the name BestBank. On Friday, May 5, 2017, as a result of bank failure, the bank was shut down by the Office of the Comptroller of the Currency. It was placed into receivership and the Federal Deposit Insurance Corporation was named receiver. The assets of the bank were sold to First Citizens BancShares.

History
The bank was established on January 1, 1923 as GUARANTY SAVINGS AND LOAN ASSOCIATION in Milwaukee, Wisconsin.

In July 2004, joined Fannie Mae in a 2-year $2 billion program to offer residential mortgages to members of ethnic minorities.

In May 2009, the bank shut GB Mortgage, its wholesale mortgage division.

In January 2013, the bank sold its Shelter Mortgage division to CIVC Partners.

In March 2013, the bank moved its headquarters from Brown Deer to Glendale, Wisconsin.

In April 2014, the Office of the Comptroller of the Currency issued a Prompt Corrective Action against the bank which stated that the bank was “significantly undercapitalized”.

On Friday, May 5, 2017, as a result of bank failure, the bank was shut down by the Office of the Comptroller of the Currency. It was placed into receivership and the Federal Deposit Insurance Corporation was named receiver. The assets of the bank were sold to First Citizens BancShares.

References

Bank failures in the United States
Banks established in 1923
Banks disestablished in 2017
Defunct banks of the United States
1923 establishments in Wisconsin